Jim Bates (born July 21, 1941) is an American former politician who served as a Democratic elected official from San Diego, California. He served four terms in the United States House of Representatives from 1983 to 1991. He was the first congressman to be disciplined for sexual harassment.

Biography
Bates was born in Denver, Colorado, and graduated from East High School (Denver) in 1959. He joined the United States Marine Corps in 1959, and served in the Corps until 1963. Relocating to San Diego, Bates became a banker and was employed in the aerospace industry.  He obtained his bachelor's degree from San Diego State University in 1975.

Political career 
Bates was elected to the San Diego city council in 1971 and served until 1974. He was elected chairman of the San Diego County board of supervisors in 1974, and held the position until 1982. At the time he was the youngest chairman of the board.

US House of Representatives 
Bates resigned from the board in 1982 to run for a seat in the U.S. House of Representatives, representing California's newly created 44th Congressional District. The district was created after the 1980 census round of redistricting as the most Democratic district in the San Diego area; it included much of the territory represented for 18 years by Lionel Van Deerlin before his defeat by Duncan Hunter. Bates won election in 1982 with 65% of the vote, and was re-elected in 1984, 1986, and 1988, with 69.7%, 64.2%, and 59.7% of the vote, respectively.

Bates was defeated in the 1990 election 46.3%-44.8% by Randy "Duke" Cunningham.  Bates ran in the Democratic primary in June 1992 for the newly created 50th District, which included much of his former territory. However, he lost the nomination to his former aide, Bob Filner.

Ethics investigations and sexual harassment 
In 1988, stories surfaced of Bates having groped and touched both women and men who worked for him as well as others.  Dorena Bertussi, a legislative assistant for Bates, testified that "he put my leg in between his and started to do a bump and grind on it, like a dog," and sued Bates for sexual harassment.   In 1989, Bates was reprimanded by the House with their lightest possible censure, a "letter of reproval". He was the first congressman to be sanctioned by the House for sexual harassment; his case is now explicitly cited in the House ethics manual as an example of impermissible sexual harassment.  Following Bates's loss in the 1990 election, Bertussi dropped her suit against him.

Bates was later implicated in the House banking scandal; he had written four bad checks to his congressional campaign.

Later career 
In 2017 Bates founded the United States-Bangladesh Friendship Group, of which he is currently Executive Director.  That group helps promotes clean water supplies and recently facilitated delivery of $3.7 million in medical equipment and supplies, donated by the non-profit Helping Hand.

See also

List of federal political sex scandals in the United States

References

External links
 Retrieved on 2009-02-13.

1941 births
Living people
Democratic Party members of the United States House of Representatives from California
Politicians from Denver
Politicians from San Diego
San Diego County Board of Supervisors members
San Diego State University alumni
United States Marines